The silver razorbelly minnow (Salmostoma acinaces syn. Salmophasia acinaces) Chela Maach in Bengali is a species of ray-finned fish in the carp family, Cyprinidae. It is native to India, where it occurs in many river systems. It has also been reported from Bangladesh.

References

Salmostoma
Fish described in 1844